Sir Walter Mordaunt Cyril Currie, 5th Baronet (3 June 1894 – 30 July 1978) was an early 20th-century poet who lived in Essex.

He wrote the lyrics for English composer Cecil Armstrong Gibbs's second symphony Odysseus, and lyrics for other religious and secular purposes.

His poem 'Perilous Ways' was set to music by the composer Martin Shaw.

Books
Poetry publications include:
Icarian Ways

References 

Baronets in the Baronetage of the United Kingdom
1894 births
1978 deaths
English male poets
20th-century English poets
20th-century English male writers